Cnemaspis kandambyi is a species of diurnal gecko endemic to island of Sri Lanka, described in 2017 from Knuckles Mountain Range.

Taxonomy
The species is closely related to Cnemaspis podihuna and found sympatric to C. kallima, C. phillipsi and C. punctata in Knuckles.

Description
The species can be identified due to three enlarged postmentals, four precloacal pores, and dark brown coloration with diamond shaped dark markings. Adult is known to ranges from 23.6 mm in length from snout to vent.

Etymology
The specific name kandambyi is named in honor of Dharma Sri Kandamby, who is a former curator of the vertebrate section of the National Museum of Colombo spanned from 1982-2012.

References

Reptiles of Sri Lanka
kandambyi
Reptiles described in 2017